The 1986–87 Xavier Musketeers men's basketball team represented Xavier University from Cincinnati, Ohio in the 1986–87 season. Led by head coach Pete Gillen, the Musketeers finished with a 21–12 record (7–5 MCC), and won the MCC tournament to receive an automatic bid to the NCAA tournament. In the NCAA tournament, the Musketeers knocked off No. 4 seed Missouri in the opening round, then lost to No. 5 seed Duke in the round of 32.

Roster

Schedule and results

|-
!colspan=9 style=| Regular season

|-
!colspan=9 style=| Midwestern Collegiate Conference tournament

|-
!colspan=9 style=| NCAA Tournament

References

Xavier
Xavier Musketeers men's basketball seasons
Xavier